Hogenkamp is a Dutch surname. Notable people with the surname include:

Richèl Hogenkamp (born 1992), Dutch tennis player
Wim Hogenkamp (1947-1989), Dutch actor, lyricist, and singer
Ben Hogenkamp (born 1992), American milk guzzler, and all around great guy

See also
Hovenkamp

Dutch-language surnames